Joe A. Palmer is a Republican Idaho State Representative since 2008 representing District 20 in the A seat.

Personal life 
Palmer attended Ricks College and Boise State University.

Elections

2019 
Palmer ran for Mayor of Meridian, Idaho.

Palmer took second, losing to Robert Simison with 32.4% of the vote.

2018 
Palmer was unopposed in the Republican Primary for District 20 A.

Palmer was opposed by perennial candidate Daniel S. Weston of the Constitution Party in the general election, winning with 81% of the vote.

2016 

Palmer was unopposed in the Republican Primary for District 20 A.

Palmer was opposed by perennial candidate Daniel S. Weston of the Constitution Party in the general election, winning with 78.9% of the vote.

Palmer endorsed Ted Cruz for Republican Party presidential primaries, 2016.

2014 

Palmer ran unopposed in the Republican Primary and in the general election.

2012 

Palmer won the three-way May 15, 2012, Republican primary with 65.9% of the vote against Richard Dees and Chris MacCloud.

Palmer defeated Caitlin Lister with 66.5% of the vote in the general election.

Palmer endorsed Mitt Romney for Republican Party presidential primaries, 2012.

2010 

Palmer won the Republican primary with 54% of the vote against Shaun Wardle.

Palmer was unopposed in the general election.

2008 

When Republican Representative Mark A. Snodgrass left the seat open in his unsuccessful bid to unseat incumbent Republican Senator Shirley McKague, Palmer won the May 27, 2008 Republican primary by 46 votes, winning with 1,725 votes (50.7%) against Meridian City Councilor Keith Bird.

Palmer won the general election with 77.3% of the vote against candidate Rex Kerr.

Committee assignments
2018 and 2017 Session 
Transportation & Defense- Chair 
Business
State Affairs

References

External links
Joe Palmer at the Idaho Legislature
 

Year of birth missing (living people)
Place of birth missing (living people)
Living people
Boise State University alumni
Brigham Young University–Idaho alumni
Republican Party members of the Idaho House of Representatives
People from Meridian, Idaho
21st-century American politicians